The following is a list of episodes in the CBS TV series Trapper John, M.D.

Series overview

Episodes

Season 1 (1979–80)

Season 2 (1980–81)

Season 3 (1981–82)

Season 4 (1982–83)

Season 5 (1983–84)

Season 6 (1984–85)

Season 7 (1985–86)

External links
 

Trapper John, M.D.